The geographical centre of Norway has been identified as a spot in the Ogndalsfjella in the southeastern part of the municipality of Steinkjer in Trøndelag county, located at .  A monument marking the significance of the spot was unveiled in a ceremony on 3 September 2006, with the hope that it would become a tourist attraction.  The site lies just to the west of the large lake Skjækervatnet.

Method of calculation
Harald Stavestrand at the Norwegian Mapping and Cadastre Authority looked for the balancing point of mainland Norway with its islands, not including sea area, the overseas areas of Svalbard and Jan Mayen, or considering elevation. Stavestrand had feared that the centre would turn out to be in Sweden due to the curved shape of Norway, but it ultimately ended up within the borders of Norway.

Other locations
Several other places have been claimed to be the centre of Norway, using differing methods. They include Harran in the municipality of Grong (halving the mainland's latitude "length"), the village of Vilhelmina in the municipality of Vilhelmina in Sweden (halving the great-circle distance), Grane Church in the municipality of Grane and Alstahaug Church in the municipality of Alstahaug (both are found by halving longer great circle distances), and finally Mosjøen in the municipality of Vefsn.

References
Statens kartverk: Norges midtpunkt 
Steinkjer kommune: Norges geografiske Midtpunkt ligger i Steinkjer 
Trønder-Avisa: Folksomt på midtpunktet, 4 September 2006 
NRK Trøndelag: Norges midtpunkt åpnet, 4 September 2006 
Norges geografiske midtpunkt – hvor er det? 
Mosjøen – byen midt i Norge 

Centre
Geography of Trøndelag
Norway
Steinkjer